Udea languidalis is a species of moth in the family Crambidae. It is found on the Balkan Peninsula and in Ukraine, Russia, Turkey and Iran.

References

Moths described in 1842
languidalis
Moths of Europe
Moths of Asia